"Trapped" is a song by American musician Colonel Abrams, released in 1985 as the first single from his self-titled debut album. It has since become known as Abrams' signature song and still receives airplay on dance radio stations in the UK and the US.

This song has arguably remained Abrams' biggest hit on both sides of the Atlantic, topping the US Hot Dance Club Play chart for one week in September 1985 and peaking at number 20 on the soul chart. Overseas, it went to number three on the UK Singles Chart.

Produced by Richard Burgess in 1984, "Trapped" is widely considered the precursor to house music, and is referred to as a proto-house track and a precursor to garage house.

Mike Stock of Stock Aitken Waterman stated that "Trapped" was a big influence on the 1987 Rick Astley smash hit "Never Gonna Give You Up".

"Trapped" was also remixed by Boards of Canada under their Hell Interface pseudonym. The resulting track, also called "Trapped", was released on Skam Record's MASK 200.

Legacy
On the October 9, 2014 episode of BBC television program Mock the Week, "Trapped" was featured in a section concerning the use of private browsing, in which comedians Dara Ó Briain (hosting) and Ed Byrne (panelist) could not stop laughing during its recording.

Track listing
12" single

7" single

Charts and certifications

Weekly charts

Year-end charts

Certifications

See also
List of number-one dance hits (United States)

References

External links

Hell Interface - 
Trapped featured in Private Browsing sketch from Mock the Week series 13, episode 11

1984 songs
1985 singles
Song recordings produced by Richard James Burgess
Colonel Abrams songs
MCA Records singles